Concert in the Virgin Islands is an album by American pianist, composer and bandleader Duke Ellington recorded and released on the Reprise label in 1965. The album features studio recordings that Ellington with the Boston Pops Orchestra conducted by Arthur Fiedler composed after he and his orchestra played concerts on St. Croix and St. Thomas in the Virgin Islands in April, 1965. This album includes the four-part Virgin Islands Suite, as well as numbers played at the concerts on the islands.

Reception
The Allmusic review by Scott Yanow awarded the album 4 stars and stated "Although in his mid-60s, Duke Ellington proves on this program of mostly new music that he never declined nor lost his creativity".

Track listing
All compositions by Duke Ellington & Billy Strayhorn except as indicated
 "Island Virgin" - 4:08  
 "Virgin Jungle" - 3:45  
 "Fiddler on the Diddle" - 3:13  
 "Jungle Kitty" - 3:00  
 "Things Ain't What They Used to Be" (Mercer Ellington) - 2:56  
 "Big Fat Alice's Blues" - 3:58  
 "Chelsea Bridge" (Strayhorn) - 3:46  
 "The Opener" - 2:50  
 "Mysterious Chick" - 3:15  
 "Barefoot Stomper" - 2:52  
 "Fade Up" (Jimmy Hamilton) - 3:31  
Recorded at Fine Studios, New York on March 4, 1965 (tracks 7, 8 & 11), March 17, 1965 (tracks 4 & 5), and April 14, 1965 (tracks 1-3, 6, 9 & 10).

Personnel
Duke Ellington – piano
Ray Nance, Cat Anderson, Herb Jones - trumpet
Cootie Williams - trumpet (tracks 1-3 & 6-11)
Howard McGhee - trumpet (tracks 4 & 5)
Lawrence Brown, Buster Cooper - trombone
Chuck Connors - bass trombone
Jimmy Hamilton - clarinet, tenor saxophone
Johnny Hodges - alto saxophone
Russell Procope - alto saxophone, clarinet
Paul Gonsalves - tenor saxophone
Harry Carney - baritone saxophone
John Lamb - bass 
Sam Woodyard - drums

References

Reprise Records albums
Duke Ellington albums
1965 albums